Jason Alias Heyward (born August 9, 1989), nicknamed "J-Hey" is an American professional baseball right fielder in the Los Angeles Dodgers organization. He has played in Major League Baseball (MLB) for the Atlanta Braves, St. Louis Cardinals, and Chicago Cubs. Originally the Braves' first-round selection in the 2007 MLB draft from Henry County High School in Georgia, he began his minor league career at age 17. Heyward soon became one of the top-rated prospects in all of baseball for batting, speed, and defense, and debuted in MLB as Atlanta's starting right fielder on Opening Day 2010. There, he played until being traded to the Cardinals after the 2014 season. He has worn uniform No. 22 throughout his major league career in honor of a high school friend and teammate who died in a traffic collision.

A three-time minor league All-Star game selection, Baseball America selected Heyward as the Braves' top overall prospect in 2007 and the organization's best power hitter; it cited Heyward as having the best strike zone discipline and excelling at multiple other skills. In 2009, he won a Minor League Player of the Year Award from both Baseball America and USA Today. That year, he batted .323 with 17 home runs (HR), 63 runs batted in (RBI), a .408 on-base percentage, and a .555 slugging percentage over 99 games. A consensus number-one MLB prospect entering the 2010 season, Baseball America, Keith Law of ESPN.com, and Jonathan Mayo of MLB.com all listed Heyward as baseball's top prospect.

After making his MLB debut for Atlanta in 2010, Heyward was named to the National League (NL) All-Star team and finished second in the NL Rookie of the Year Award. Baseball America named him their MLB Rookie of the Year. Injuries limited his playing time in 2011 and 2013. With a breakout season in 2012, he hit 27 home runs with 82 RBI and 21 stolen bases while finishing tenth in the NL in runs scored with 93. Also recognized for his defense including coverage in the deepest parts of right field, he won both the Fielding Bible and NL Gold Glove Awards for right fielders in 2012, 2014, 2015, 2016 and 2017 and Wilson's MLB Defensive Player of the Year in 2014. He is widely regarded as one of the best outfield defenders in baseball.

Early life and amateur career
The son of Dartmouth graduates, Jason Heyward was born on August 9, 1989, in Ridgewood, New Jersey. His father, Eugene, is from Beaufort, South Carolina, and mother, Laura, is from New York City; they met at Dartmouth. Eugene played basketball and majored in engineering and Laura studied French. Eugene's uncle, Kenny Washington, played basketball for two John Wooden-led NCAA championship UCLA teams in 1964 and 1965. Jason has one younger brother, Jacob (b. 1995), who attended the University of Miami and played baseball for the Hurricanes. Jacob was drafted by the San Francisco Giants in 2016 and has played in the minors since.

The Heywards moved to the Atlanta metropolitan area soon after he was born. Jason played and showed marked ability in baseball from an early age. Before he turned 10, he played for a national championship. Eugene helped fuel both of his sons' passion for baseball. He dedicated himself to driving them to every tournament and competition possible in the family Chevrolet Suburban, which racked up hundreds of thousands of miles between the events and his 90-minute work commute to and from Robins Air Force Base to the south in Houston County.

While his father emphasized that working hard and approaching the game with discipline were important, he also stressed that baseball was to be, above all else, fun. Heyward has maintained this same approach throughout his youth and professional career. One tournament in which he played was the renowned East Cobb Baseball program, where he was a standout and has produced other major league players. Heyward attended Henry County High School in McDonough near Atlanta. Heyward briefly played basketball in his youth but concentrated exclusively on baseball in high school at his father's urging. In February 2010, an Associated Press reporter learned from a varsity coach that Heyward's early batting practice exploits proved fatal to an oak tree in deep center field at the high school playing field.

Facing off against future Major League Baseball (MLB) catcher Buster Posey of Lee County High in the Georgia Class AAAA baseball championship during Heyward's sophomore year, Henry County won two of the best-of-three series. Posey was actually the starting pitcher in the first game as Henry Country prevailed, 2–1. Heyward hit a game-tying  home run in Game 2 to cap an eight-run comeback, but Lee County prevailed 14–10. The next game, Heyward's three-run single was the game and series winner in a 16–14 outcome. During his junior season, he again helped lead the Henry County High Warhawks to the state championship. As a senior, he batted .520 with eight home runs (HR) and 29 runs batted in (RBI).

One of Heyward's close friends and teammates from the 2005 AAAA Georgia state championship team, Andrew Wilmot, died in a traffic collision while attending college. Wilmot was a catcher who wore the uniform number 22, the number Heyward would later wear in his major league career to honor him. Wilmot's mother, Tammie Ruston, was Heyward's high school literature teacher in his senior year.

Numerous colleges showed interest and recruited Heyward, including UCLA, which offered a full-ride scholarship due in part to the family connection. Heyward was also especially interested in Clemson and Georgia Tech. Concurrently, the hometown Atlanta Braves had followed and scouted him for years, while attempting to conceal their excitement. They made him the 14th overall selection in the 2007 Major League Baseball draft. Despite signing a National Letter of Intent with UCLA, Heyward chose professional baseball over college and signed a contract with them worth $1.7 million – $170,000 more than MLB's slot recommendation of $1.53 million on the following August 12. It was the same as the 2006 14th-slot amount that the Toronto Blue Jays gave Travis Snider.

Professional career

Minor leagues (2007–09)

GCL Braves, Danville, Rome, and Myrtle Beach (2007–08)
At age 17, Heyward started his professional career in Minor League Baseball in the Braves' system. He played for both the Gulf Coast League Braves and the Danville Braves of the Appalachian League in 2007. He homered in his first professional game. In 12 minor league contests in 2007, he batted .302 with one home run and six runs batted in (RBIs). He split the next season with Class-A Rome of the South Atlantic League (SAL) and Advanced-A Myrtle Beach of the Carolina League.

Beginning the season with Rome, Heyward batted .330 (33-for-100) in April 26 games to go with three home runs, 16 RBI, and seven stolen bases (SB). He was subsequently named the club's Player of the Month. In each month that followed, he also batted over .300, except for July: .345 in May, .315 in June, .250 in July, and .386 in August. From May 7–19, he put together a season-high 11-game hitting streak, batting .386 with five doubles (2B) and two home runs. He drove in a season-high five runs on June 30 against Columbus to go with three hits, including a home run.

While playing for Rome, Heyward authored 42 multi-hit games, including two four-hit games. He finished in the top three in nine offensive categories for the club. He batted .351 (33-for-94) off left-handed pitchers (LHP) with four home runs and .315 (112-for-355) with seven home runs against right-handed pitchers (RHP). His season totals with the club included a .323 batting average (third in the SAL), .388 on-base percentage (OBP, fourth), 88 runs scored (fifth), and an .874 on-base plus slugging percentage (OPS, sixth).

The Braves promoted him to Myrtle Beach on August 25, where he played seven more games. With four hits in 22 AB, his average was .182. There, he added four RBI. Between the two clubs, his .316 batting average led the Braves' minor league system, 91 runs ranked second, 29 doubles and 149 hits both ranked fifth, and six triples and .854 OPS both ranked sixth. He also totaled 15 stolen bases.

More awards followed the 2008 season. Baseball America named Heyward the South Atlantic League's Most Outstanding Prospect, Top Batting Prospect, and Most Exciting Player. He was also a Baseball America All-Star for the entire minor leagues, Mid- and Post-Season All-Star, Low-Class A All-Star, and the Braves' second-best prospect. MLB.com named him the third-best overall minor league prospect. ESPN.com named him the minor leagues' best corner outfield prospect, the #1 Atlanta prospect, and third-overall minor-league prospect.

Myrtle Beach, Mississippi and Gwinnett (2009)
Starting 2009 at Myrtle Beach, Heyward then gained successive promotions to Double-A Mississippi and Triple-A Gwinnett that year. He reached base in 42 of 49 contests at Myrtle Beach and assembled 16 multi-hit contests. He was the Carolina League Player of the Week on May 18 after garnering six hits in 23 at-bats (.261), with three home runs and five RBI. In late May, he endured an oblique injury, which caused him to miss several games. He was a selection to the Carolina League All-Star team but missed the game due to the oblique injury. He participated in the All-Star Futures Game at Busch Stadium, where he collected one hit in two at-bats. He carried a nine-game hitting streak through July 4.

On July 4, the Braves promoted Heyward to Mississippi, where he extended the streak to 13 games, totaling 19 hits in 52 at-bats (.352) with four doubles and 14 RBI. On July 16, he matched a career-high with four hits. For that month, he attained 34 hits, 14 walks, 11 doubles, three home runs, 19 RBI, and a 1.230 OPS in 22 games. The Braves named him their Mississippi Player of the Month. His totals with the club included a .446 OBP and 1.057 OPS. From September 5–7, he appeared with the Gwinnett Braves of the Triple-A of the International League.  He also played four games with the Peoria Saguaros of the Arizona Fall League (AFL), collecting four hits in 14 AB and three 2B.

Over three levels in 99 games, he batted .323 with 17 home runs and 10 steals, including high numbers in OBP (.408), slugging percentage (SLG, .555), and OPS (.963), while scoring 69 runs and driving in 63 runs. He ranked in the top ten in the organization in many offensive categories including second in runs, third in average, home runs and OPS, sixth in hits (117) and RBI and tied for seventh in doubles (25). He displayed consistent hitting ability against both RHP and LHP. In 2009, Heyward hit .339 in 112 AB against LHP and .316 against RHP. In his minor league career through 2009, he had batted .335 with six home runs against left-handed pitchers and .313 with 23 home runs against right-handed pitchers.

That September, both Baseball America and USA Today named him their Minor League Player of the Year. A consensus number-one MLB prospect entering the 2010 season, Baseball America, Keith Law of ESPN.com and Jonathan Mayo of MLB.com each listed Heyward as baseball's top prospect; BA ranked him ahead of Stephen Strasburg and Giancarlo Stanton. Further, Baseball America tabbed him the #1 prospect in both the Southern and Carolina Leagues, the Best Batting Prospect in all of Double-A and the Most Exciting Player in Single-A. He won the Braves' organization Hank Aaron Award (not to be confused with MLB's Hank Aaron Award), conferred annually to the top offensive player in the Braves organization.

During his first three years in the minor leagues, Baseball America also ranked parts of Heyward's skill sets as the best among Braves minor leaguers, including Best Strike-Zone Discipline (three times), Best Hitter for Average (twice), Best Hitter for Power (once), Best Defensive Outfielder (once), and Best Outfield Arm (once). The Braves added Heyward to their 40-man roster before the 2010 season.

Atlanta Braves (2010–14)

2010

After a rapid ascent through the minor leagues, the Braves invited Heyward to spring training in March 2010. There, his hitting continued to draw notice, as he routinely hit "rockets" all over the field and over the fences, compelling manager Bobby Cox to make him a regular in the lineup. He mentioned that he heard the balls hit off Heyward's bat made a different, more pronounced sound. Reggie Jackson, a New York Yankees special assistant, concurred, characterizing that sound as "stereo," while everyone else was "in AM." Heyward hit two notable batting practice home runs at the Champion Stadium training complex in the Lake Buena Vista, Florida. One damaged a Coca-Cola truck in the parking lot, and another broke the sunroof of Atlanta Braves' assistant general manager Bruce Manno's car. He was initially issued uniform number 71. At the end of spring training, he asked the team for and received number 22. He presented one of his jerseys with the number 22 to Ruston to show that he honored her son, which elicited an emotional reaction from her.

By now one of the most anticipated prospects in all baseball, shirts depicting his nickname, "The J-Hey Kid," was in high demand before he even played his first official major league game. Fans and pundits prognosticated on a future Hall of Fame career, eliciting comparisons to former greats such as Darryl Strawberry, Willie McCovey and Willie Mays, among many others. In fact, "The J-Hey Kid" was drawn from Mays' nickname, "The Say Hey Kid." On March 26, after leading the club in on-base and slugging percentages in spring training, the Braves named Heyward their starting right fielder.

Eugene Heyward purchased 60 tickets in advance of his son's MLB debut on April 5 against the Chicago Cubs. Wearing Heyward's #22 jersey, Ruston was also in attendance for the game. The ball landed near the right-field seats where Ruston was sitting. Heyward became the fifth player in Braves history to hit a home run in his first major league at-bat, and the eleventh in franchise history to do so in his MLB debut, on the heels of Jordan Schafer, who did it the previous year.

Through Atlanta's first 50 games, Heyward robustly lived up to the hype, hitting 10 home runs while batting .301 with a .421 OBP and .596 slugging percentage.  He was named the National League (NL) Rookie of the Month in both April and May. However, after sustaining a thumb injury while sliding in May, he missed playing time. After he returned later in the season, his performance declined, and consistency was elusive. He was selected as a starter for the NL All-Star team, but did not participate due to the thumb injury.

After stealing home in a double steal against the Washington Nationals in the first inning on July 28, he became the first Brave to do so since Rafael Furcal, who did it more than ten years earlier. A 16–5 victory over the Cubs on August featured Heyward's first MLB multi-home run game and career highs in hits and runs scored with four each. In the final 112 games of the season, Heyward batted .266 with a .381 OBP and .396 SLG. His postseason debut was on October 7 in the National League Division Series (NLDS) against the San Francisco Giants. Heyward was hitless in three at bats with two strikeouts. After he collected just two hits in the series, San Francisco eliminated Atlanta on their way to winning the World Series.

Heyward finished his first major league season with a .277 batting average, .393 on-base percentage, 18 home runs, 29 doubles, 91 bases on balls, and 83 runs scored in 142 regular season games. He ranked fourth overall in the NL in OBP and walks. His longest streak of reaching base was 36 consecutive games. At the time, his OBP was the second-highest in major league history for a rookie aged 20 years or younger, after Ted Williams and before Frank Robinson, and OPS of .849 placed 30th in all MLB history counting rookie seasons. The recipient of several major awards, Heyward was named the Sporting News NL Rookie of the Year, Baseball America'''s MLB Rookie of the Year, an outfielder on the magazine's All-Rookie Team, and to Topps' Major League Rookie All-Star Team. He finished second to Posey for the NL Rookie of the Year award and 20th in the NL Most Valuable Player (MVP) award balloting.

2011
Heyward's second MLB season commenced in a fashion that reprised the high expectations from his rookie season, but injuries ultimately factored into a lengthy and dramatic slump. In the spring, he was diagnosed with a degenerative condition in his lower back. Like his first MLB at-bat, he began with a home run in his first at-bat of the season on March 31, of Nationals pitcher Liván Hernández. He became just the second player, after Kazuo Matsui, to homer in his first major league at-bat on opening day, and do the same the following year. Since being drafted in 2007, it was also the third time Heyward homered in his first game of the season.

In a back-and-forth game with the Giants on April 24, he hit a go-ahead home run off relief pitcher Jeremy Affeldt in a 9–6, ten-inning victory. In the final eight games of the month, he hit .400 with three home runs and a .714 slugging percentage.  For the month of April, Heyward hit seven home runs with an .879 OPS. Having previously been represented by Victor Menocal from Career Sports Entertainment (CSE) until Menocal resigned from CSE, news emerged on May 6 that Heyward switched his agent to Casey Close.

From the beginning of spring training, Heyward endured lingering shoulder soreness. After collecting just four hits in 41 at-bats in May, the Braves performed a magnetic resonance imaging (MRI) scan on May 12 which revealed an inflamed rotator cuff but no structural damage. He rested and received a cortisone injection, but aggravated the injury days later during batting practice. The Braves placed him on the disabled list (DL) on May 22. Public criticism from teammate Chipper Jones for not playing through his injuries followed the next month; said Jones, "I think where Jason might have erred was the comment that he made, 'I'm not coming back until it doesn't hurt anymore.' ... What Jason needs to realize is that Jason at 80 percent is a force, and Jason at 80 percent is better than a lot of people in this league." Jones later explained that he reassured Heyward in a phone call that he did not intend to misrepresent Heyward's efforts to rehabilitate.

Heyward returned from the DL with increased difficulty to drive the ball while batting. A sixth-inning home run against the Baltimore Orioles on July 1 was Heyward's first since April 29 against the St. Louis Cardinals, a span of 104 at-bats.  However, he hit just four home runs from the end of April through August 11.  Further, his walk rate declined from 14.6 percent the year before to 10.7 percent. His line drive rate in that time dropped from 17.8 to 13 percent and one-quarter of his balls hit in the air were infield pop-ups, compared with eight percent the year before. During a game against the Chicago Cubs on August 23, he hit his first career grand slam.

Through the end of August, the Braves were the NL wild card leader. However, the Cardinals overcame a -game deficit for the wild card position by winning 20 of their final 28 to eliminate the Braves from the playoffs on the final day, consummating one of the epic late-season collapses in MLB history. After battling a shoulder injury from the beginning of the season, Heyward's overall performance dropped off from his rookie season. His batting average dropped 50 points to .227; his other contributions, also in decline, included 14 home runs, 42 RBI, 18 doubles, and nine stolen bases in 128 games. He batted .240 against right-handed pitchers, compared with .192 against left-handers.

2012
To remedy the decline in performance from the season before, Heyward took extra steps in his preseason preparation. He streamlined his swing to mitigate bad habits incorporated after the shoulder injury. He modified his diet to include more fruits, chicken, and fish. He started the 2012 season slowly. However, his bases loaded double on May 13 off Lance Lynn proved the game-winning run as the Braves triumphed over the Cardinals, 7–4.

With a .233 batting average through May, his production increased in June. His first multi-HR game of the season, and second of his career, on June 7 helped secure an 8–2 victory over the Marlins. That month, he batted .353 with six home runs and a 1.080 OPS. He also registered four outfield assists, including one that put Mark Teixeira out at home plate on June 19, preserving a 4–3 win over the New York Yankees.

The following game, also at Yankee Stadium, he launched two home runs for his third career – and second of the season – multi-HR game. It was a contest that featured nine home runs between the two clubs, tying a Yankee Stadium record, including the original incarnation built-in 1923. That same week, ending June 24, he won his first NL Player of the Week Award. In six interleague games, he batted a league-leading .522 (12-for-23) and 1.130 slugging percentage. Further, his three home runs, 12 hits, 26 total bases, and nine runs scored each tied for the league lead. He also added three multi-hit games and five RBI.

In a 12-game hitting streak that spanned from June 13–27, Heyward batted .455 (20-for-44) and homered four times. One hit during that streak was a single on June 16 against the Baltimore Orioles that ended Jason Hammel's no-hit bid in the seventh inning to leave him a one-hit complete game shutout in the Orioles' 5–0 victory. Heyward's home run in an 8–2 defeat of the Marlins on July 30 helped end Atlanta's streak of 16 losses on Mondays.

After the season, Heyward captured his first career defensive awards for right fielders: the singular MLB Fielding Bible Award, and his first NL Rawlings Gold Glove Award. In 158 games, his batting statistics included a .269 average with career highs of 27 home runs, 82 RBI, 93 runs scored, 158 hits, 30 doubles, six triples, .479 slugging percentage and 21 SB. He batted .300 (105-for-350) with 20 home runs against right-handers but just .224 (53-for-237) against left-handers. It was the second time he received consideration in the NL MVP balloting, finishing tied for 28th.

2013
On January 18, 2013, the Braves avoided arbitration with Heyward in his first time eligible, agreeing on a one-year, $3.65 million deal. He was counted on as a component in the outfield including newly acquired brothers Justin and B. J. Upton, with whom he would play until being traded after the 2014 season. An appendectomy on April 22 led him to being placed on the 15-day disabled list. In his first 31 games of the season, he batted .142 (15-for-106) with two home runs and eight RBI. He returned from the appendectomy on May 17, going 2-for-4 in an 8–5 win against the Dodgers. His first multi-HR game of the season came against San Diego on June 10.

In 37 games following the All-Star break, Heyward batted .305 with on OBP of .397 and OPS of .932. He collected 40 hits in 131 at-bats with nine doubles, seven home runs, and 17 RBI. During a 19-game stretch from July 28 to August 17, he batted .400 (30-for-75) with a .457 OBP, six doubles, five home runs – four as a leadoff hitter – 15 RBI, eight BB, and 23 runs scored. On August 17, he hit his second multi-HR game of the season against Washington. In August, his .348 batting average (23 hits in 66 AB) ranked tenth in the NL.

New York Mets pitcher Jon Niese hit Heyward in the face with a pitch on August 21, fracturing his jaw in two places.  He had surgery, which required the insertion of two plates, and returned on September 20.  Heyward began wearing a protective shield attached to the right side of his batting helmet. He struck out and walked in a 9–5 win against the Chicago Cubs.

Six days later, Heyward set career highs against Philadelphia with five hits, four extra-base hits and matched a career-best three doubles. He also hit his third career – and second of the season – leadoff home run. In his last 31 games of the season, starting July 28, he hit at a .333 (38-for-114) clip. He batted .322 (38-for-118) with a .403 OBP in 30 games as a leadoff hitter. After two stints on the DL, Heyward appeared in 104 total games, batting .254 with 14 home runs, 22 2B, 38 RBI, 67 runs scored, and two stolen bases. The Braves record was 71–33 in the games in which he appeared.

2014

The Braves bought out Heyward's last arbitration-eligible years on February 4, 2014, agreeing on a two-year, $13.3 million contract. Already rated one of the top defensive outfielders in the league, his coverage in right field significantly improved, demonstrated through an increased defensive runs saved (DRS) total. Through May 19, he registered 16 DRS, matching three of his previous four entire season totals. Inside Edge (IE) charted that of all batted balls hit to him, Heyward had missed a total of nine in 358 innings; all nine were rated as having a 10% or lower chance of being caught. Two catches in motion off the bat of Mike Trout – one tumbling on a sinking line drive and one sprinting and leaping at the warning track – helped ensure a 7–3 victory over the Los Angeles Angels of Anaheim on June 15. Heyward also added a home run.

Playing as the Braves' primary leadoff hitter, he played in 149 games and finished with a .271 batting average, .351 on-base percentage, 74 runs scored, 11 home runs, 58 RBI and 20 stolen bases. Caught stealing just four times, his 83.33% success rate placed seventh in the NL. Defensively, Heyward registered a standout season. In 149 games in right field, he led the NL at his position in putouts (365), assists (nine), range factor per nine innings (2.56) and game (2.51), fielding percentage (.997), and total zone runs (30). Among all NL outfielders, he was fifth in assists, third in range factor per game and second in putouts and fielding percentage.

Further, per Baseball-Reference.com, Heyward registered fourth in the league with 2.8 defensive wins above replacement (dWAR) and led all MLB players with 32 total DRS. He saved 40 bases on deep-hit balls, which was the highest output of his career and led all MLB outfielders. Accordingly, Heyward was the recipient of several awards, including his second of both the Rawlings NL Gold Glove Award and the Fielding Bible Award for all MLB right fielders, the latter of which he won unanimously. Wilson Sporting Goods named him their MLB right field Defensive Player of the Year and overall MLB Defensive Player of the Year.

St. Louis Cardinals (2015)
On November 17, 2014, the Braves traded Heyward to the St. Louis Cardinals along with pitcher Jordan Walden for pitchers Shelby Miller and Tyrell Jenkins to replace their former right fielder and top prospect Oscar Taveras, who died in a car accident a month earlier. Cardinals manager Mike Matheny, who wore uniform #22 and had also done so for most of his playing career, gave his number to Heyward. Heyward wears this number to honor his friend Andrew Wilmot. After the trade was announced, Heyward published a Twitter message thanking the Atlanta Braves organization and fans for their support.

Five years to the day of his MLB debut, Heyward appeared in his first game as a Cardinal against the Chicago Cubs on April 5, 2015. He garnered three hits, including two doubles and a stolen base in a 3–0 victory. His first home run as a Cardinals player was on April 18 against the Cincinnati Reds at Busch Stadium with a 5–2 win. After uncharacteristic errors in both of the two previous games, his ninth-inning home run against the Arizona Diamondbacks on May 27 tied the game 3–3, and the Cardinals eventually won with a score of 4–3.  He homered in three straight games June 22–24, including successive contests against the Marlins from June 23–24 as St. Louis won both times. On July 18 against the Mets, he matched a career high with five hits in a 12–2 win.

In an August 16 contest against the Marlins, Heyward hit two home runs for his first multi-home run game with the Cardinals. An important defensive play was on September 20 against the Cubs. With the bases loaded and no outs in the eighth inning, Addison Russell hit a fly ball that Heyward caught running and threw home to catcher Yadier Molina to tag out Anthony Rizzo by two steps, preserving a 4–3 win. In the second game of a doubleheader against Pittsburgh on September 30, Heyward hit his second career grand slam in an 11–1 win, giving the Cardinals their 100th victory of the season while clinching their third consecutive National League Central division title. He also robbed both Francisco Cervelli and Michael Morse of hits in this game.

Heyward finished the season with a career-high .293 batting average, .359 on-base percentage, and .439 slugging percentage. Since his major league debut, he also had led all major league fielders in DRS and, for the previous three seasons, was second only to former Braves teammate Andrelton Simmons. Among all outfielders since 2010, Heyward's 96.2 accumulated ultimate zone rating (UZR) led all major league outfielders to second-place Alex Gordon's 68.3 UZR. After becoming a free agent for the first time in his career, Heyward won his third Fielding Bible Award and third Gold Glove Award.

Chicago Cubs (2016–2022)
2016

On December 15, 2015, Heyward signed an eight-year, $184 million contract with the Cubs. One of his first acts after signing his contract was to pay for hotel suites large enough to accommodate teammate David Ross, his wife, and their three young children on all of the Cubs' road trips during the 2016 season. Ross, set to retire after the 2016 season, had been Heyward's teammate during his first three seasons in Atlanta, and Heyward considered him a key mentor in his early MLB career. In an interview with Bleacher Report, Heyward said,I know how special it is to have teammates like he was my first three years in Atlanta. You don't take it for granted. I wanted to say thank you from the bottom of my heart, as a teammate and as a friend, for what he's done for me.

Heyward struggled in his first season with the Cubs in 2016, batting only .230 with 7 home runs and 49 RBIs, while leading the majors in percentage of soft-hit batted balls (27.1%), though he would win his 4th Gold Glove award that season.

In Game 4 of the 2016 National League Division Series against the San Francisco Giants with the Cubs having a 2–1 series lead, Heyward reached on a bunt force out, moved to second on an errant throw, and scored the go-ahead run on a Javier Baez single, sending the Cubs to the 2016 National League Championship Series.

On October 25, 2016, Heyward, along with teammates Dexter Fowler, Addison Russell, and Carl Edwards Jr., became the first African-Americans to play for the Cubs in a World Series game. Heyward was credited with leading an inspiring players-only meeting during a 17-minute rain delay near the end of Game 7 of the 2016 World Series. The Cubs eventually won the game 8–7 after 10 innings, which gave the franchise its first World Series championship in 108 years. On November 9, Heyward became the first position player in Major League Baseball history to win three straight Gold Glove Awards with three different teams (Braves, Cardinals, and Cubs).

2017
On May 8, 2017, Heyward went on the 10-day disabled list due to a sprained finger he suffered in a game against the Yankees three days prior. In late June, Heyward suffered a left-hand laceration while catching a foul ball in Pittsburgh and was unavailable to play in the next series of games. In 55 of the first 67 games of the 2017 season, Heyward had improved his statistics from the prior year with a batting average of .258, a .315 OBP and .399 SLG. He was third on the team with 29 RBIs and third with 84 total bases. He was placed on the disabled list a month later with a hand injury.

Heyward chose "J-Hey" as his nickname for the Players Weekend during the 2017 season.

2018
On May 8, 2018, Heyward again went on the disabled list due to concussion protocol after attempting a game-saving catch of a Dexter Fowler 14th inning home run. On June 6 Jason Heyward hit a walk-off grand slam home run with two outs in the bottom of the 9th to give the Cubs a 7–5 win over the Philadelphia Phillies. At the All-Star break Heyward's stats for the year showed continuing improvement over his previous time with the Cubs. He had a .285 batting average with 78 hits in 274 plate appearances with 6 home runs and 41 RBIs, a .344 OBP and a .431 SLG.

2019
Heyward had a fast and quality start to the season. He hit two home runs and stole two bases against the Milwaukee Brewers on April 6, becoming only the 18th player—and first Cub—to have a multi-homer, multi-steal game since 1901. It was also his first multi-homer game as a Cub. On April 24, he hit a dramatic three-run home run late in the game to regain the lead in a 7–6 victory against the Los Angeles Dodgers. On May 8, Heyward hit a walk-off, solo home run against the Miami Marlins in the 11th inning, giving the Cubs a 3–2 win. This was Heyward's third walk-off hit as a Cub (second home run), also snapping a 1-for-20 slump in the process.

2020
In the pandemic-shortened 2020 season, Heyward batted .265/.392/.456 with 6 home runs and 22 RBIs in 50 games. His .848 OPS was his highest since his rookie season in 2010, and he recorded a perfect 1.000 fielding percentage in right field.

2021
In 2021, Heyward slashed .214/.280/.347 with 8 home runs and 30 RBIs in 104 games.

2022
On May 8, 2022, Heyward was placed on the injured list with a left quadriceps strain. He returned to the IL in late June. As Heyward remained on the injured list through August, Cubs general manager Jed Hoyer stated that the team would release Heyward at the end of the season.

Los Angeles Dodgers
On December 8, 2022, Heyward signed a minor league contract with the Los Angeles Dodgers that included an invitation to major league spring training.

Awards

Skills profile

Standing  and weighing , Heyward has shown to be an all-round talent.  In the minor leagues, his ability to hit for batting average and power, speed, plus defense and arm strength sufficient to play right field, caused him to be considered a five-tool player.  Further, his plate discipline and ability to draw walks are unusual for a player his height.  He generates much of his power as a pull hitter.

From very early in his career, Heyward has played with outside anticipation of developing into one of the most dominant players in the league.  However, he has mentioned being uncomfortable with the pressure that comes with such expectations.  Journalist Bernie Miklasz of the St. Louis Post-Dispatch'' opined that the pressures of stardom obliquely induced the overall descent in performance from his rookie season.

Heyward still has a hole in his swing that has yet to resolve. While he was in the minor leagues, his unorthodox swing was not regarded as a significant issue, but rather was perceived to have worked for him because of his enormous talent.  On the contrary, one scout compared it to an awkward golf swing. "You watch him, he really stiff-arms the bat out there," noting Heyward almost fully extends his arms to attempt to power the head of the bat through the strike zone.  He does not protect the inside of part of the strike zone as well as the outside. That creates a weakness that allows pitchers – especially power pitchers – to throw inside, thus exploiting an inability to attain contact on inside pitches efficiently.

"The ball he hits well is the ball out away from him," according to the same scout. "If pitchers pitch around him, on the outer half, he'll crush it. ... That's why Niese hit him: He went up and in, and Heyward's a diver." Indeed, charts from STATS LLC depicting Heyward's "Hot Zones," or a hitter's zones of maximum effectiveness, corroborate the scout's findings.  Through April 25, 2014, Heyward had swung at 22 of 55 pitches in 2014 that qualified as "up and in," crossing the plate either to the upper left ninth of the strike zone or slightly higher or inside of it. None of those 22 swings had produced a hit.

However, an injury contributed to lost power in 2011. Before that point, Heyward dropped his hands after the start of the swing and rotated his front shoulder in an upward motion in his mode as a pull hitter. Normally, the front half of his upper body generates bat velocity. During the time the injury had not properly healed, it hindered his ability to generate torque from his front shoulder that contributed most to driving the ball.

Despite not reaching his offensive projections, his defense has delivered as promised. Heyward has been rated as one of the top right fielders, if not the top right fielder, in MLB. The Fielding Bible staff has said that he "is the best defensive right fielder in baseball, bar none." He is an expert at instantly picking up and reacting to the path of the batted ball and following it with efficient routes. Such defensive ability was demonstrated on a fly ball off Justin Turner's bat during the 2013 season. The same play was part of a demonstration in 2014 of Major League Baseball Advanced Media's Statcast system, a hybrid of PITCHf/x, FIELDf/x, and a radar-based play tracking. The ball had 4.0 seconds of hang time and he ran  for the catch.

In the rating of three zones to where the ball is hit in the right field in his first five seasons, he was above average at saving bases on shallow-hit (+31) and medium-hit (+40) balls. His greatest strength came with deep-hit balls (+140). In 2014 alone, he saved +40 bases on balls hit to the deepest part of right field, which was the equivalent of 20 doubles. The enormous ground coverage makes up for what would be considered a slightly below-average arm among right fielders. Commented Fielding Bible founder John Dewan, "Heyward has been able to accomplish this (winning the Fielding Bible Award) by starting and finishing every play extremely well. He excels at picking up the ball off the bat and rarely takes the wrong angle. He is not afraid to dive, demonstrating tremendous body control when doing so."

Personal life

In September 2012, Piedmont Henry Hospital in Stockbridge, Georgia, selected Heyward as one of ten representatives for their Real Men Wear Pink campaign against breast cancer. He stated at the time one of his grandmothers was battling the condition but had improved, and that her battle was an inspiration for him to participate.

Heyward's brother, Jacob, is an outfielder in the San Francisco Giants organization. Jacob Heyward was drafted by the Braves out of high school in the 2013 MLB Draft and the San Francisco Giants in the 2016 MLB Draft.

Heyward is married to Vedrana Heyward. Their son was born in March 2022. They own a $5.9 million mansion in the Gold Coast neighborhood of Chicago.

See also

 List of Major League Baseball career putouts as a right fielder leaders
 List of Major League Baseball players with a home run in their first major league at bat

Notes

References

Footnote

Source notes

External links

MLB Top 50 prospects – Scouting Report

1989 births
Living people
Atlanta Braves players
St. Louis Cardinals players
Chicago Cubs players
Danville Braves players
Gulf Coast Braves players
Rome Braves players
Myrtle Beach Pelicans players
Mississippi Braves players
Gwinnett Braves players
Peoria Saguaros players
African-American baseball players
Baseball players from New Jersey
Major League Baseball right fielders
National League All-Stars
People from McDonough, Georgia
Baseball players from Atlanta
People from Ridgewood, New Jersey
Gold Glove Award winners
Articles containing video clips
21st-century African-American sportspeople
20th-century African-American people
South Bend Cubs players
Iowa Cubs players